The Astonished Heart is a 1950 British drama film directed by Terence Fisher and Antony Darnborough. Starring Celia Johnson, Noël Coward, and Margaret Leighton, the film is based on Coward's play The Astonished Heart from his cycle of ten plays, Tonight at 8.30.

Inspired by the great success of the 1945 film Brief Encounter, which also had been adapted from Tonight at 8:30, Coward agreed to have The Astonished Heart produced as a motion picture. As with the previous film, Coward also wrote the screenplay. Production began in 1949 and featured not only Noël Coward in one of his rare film appearances, but also actor-singer Graham Payn in a supporting role. The Astonished Heart was released in 1950 to indifferent reviews and was a commercial failure.

Plot
The film follows the growing obsession of a psychiatrist (Coward) for an impulsive younger woman (Leighton) and the resulting tragedy this leads to.
The doctor quotes : "The LORD shall smite thee with madness, and blindness, and astonishment of heart," foreshadowing his path while making reference to the movie title.

The May–December affair between a psychiatrist and young blonde destroys his seemingly blissful relationship with his wife (Celia Johnson).  In the end, Dr. Christian Faber's obsession with his beautiful mistress, Leonora Vail, leads him to commit suicide by jumping from the roof of the block of flats where he was living with his wife, and also where he conducted business with his partner Tim and assistant Susan.  He lives long enough to ask for Leonora, but when she comes to his deathbed he does not know her, and thinks she is his wife (Barbara).

Cast

Celia Johnson as Barbara Faber
Noël Coward as Dr. Christian Faber
Margaret Leighton as Leonora Vail
Joyce Carey as Susan Birch
Graham Payn as Tim Verney
Amy Veness as Alice Smith
Ralph Michael as Philip Lucas
Michael Hordern as Ernest
Patricia Glyn as Helen
Alan Webb as Sir Reginald
Everley Gregg as Miss Harper
John Salew as Mr. Bowman

Production
In July 1948, Sydney Box, head of Gainsborough Studios, paid £10,000 to Noël Coward to script four plays from Tonight at 8:30 and a revue, Nothing New. Box was happy with the script for Astonished Heart and put it into production with Michael Redgrave in the lead, with Coward's approval. Coward returned from Jamaica a week into filming, saw the rushes, and demanded Redgrave be sacked. Coward's contract gave him the power to do this. He then persuaded J. Arthur Rank to allow Coward to take over the lead role for a fee of £15,000.

Critical reception
The New York Times wrote, "Mr. Coward is capable of doing better, though there are moments when the dialogue lets off caustic sparks."

References

External links

Time Out Film Guide 2009

1950 films
Films directed by Terence Fisher
Films shot at Pinewood Studios
British films based on plays
1950s English-language films
British drama films
1950 drama films
Gainsborough Pictures films
Films set in London
British black-and-white films
1950s British films